Airwatt or air watt is a measurement unit of the effectiveness of vacuum cleaners which refers to airflow and the amount of power (watts) a vacuum cleaner produces and uses.
It can also be referred to as a measurement of the energy per unit time of the air flowing through an opening, which is related to the energy that electricity carries through the power cable (wattage).

The airwatt is a useful measurement of vacuum cleaner motor efficiency, since the power carried by a fluid flow (in the case of a typical house vacuum the fluid is air) is equal to pressure times volumetric flow rate.  The airwatt relates to actual airflow, while part of the electrical power (watts) consumed by a vacuum cleaner is dissipated into heat due to necessarily imperfect efficiency; two vacuum cleaners of the same airwattage have essentially the same suction, while devices of the same electrical wattage may have a difference in efficiency and thus have substantially different airwattage.

Definition
The formula used to compute airwattage differs between vacuum cleaner manufacturers. The standard airwatt formula is from ASTM International (see document ASTM F558 - 13)

Where P is the power in airwatts, F is the rate per minute (denoted cu ft/min or CFM) and S is the suction capacity expressed as a pressure in units of inches of water.

Some manufacturers choose to use the fraction  rather than the ASTM decimal, leading to a less than 0.25% variation in their calculations.

Where airflow in Cubic Feet per Minute [CFM] is calculated using 
airflow =  / vacuum 

Where D is the diameter of the orifices.

CFM is always given statistically at its maximum which is at a  opening. Waterlift, on the other hand, is always given at its maximum: a 0-inch opening. When waterlift is at a 0-inch opening, then the flow rate is zero – no air is moving, thus the power is also 0 airwatts.

If the flow rate were given in litres per second (L/s), then the pressure would be in kilopascals (kPa). Thus one watt equals one kilopascal times one litre per second: 

The ratio between the Airwatt rating (power produced in the flow) and electrical watts (power from voltage and current) is the efficiency of the vacuum.

Ratings recommendations
Hoover recommends 100 airwatts for upright vacuum cleaners and 220 airwatts for "cylinder" (canister) vacuum cleaners.

References

Units of power